Joan Jett (born Joan Marie Larkin, September 22, 1958) is an American singer, guitarist, record producer and actress. Jett is best known for her work as the frontwoman of her band Joan Jett and the Blackhearts, and for earlier founding and performing with the Runaways, which recorded and released the hit song "Cherry Bomb". With The Blackhearts, Jett is known for her rendition of the song "I Love Rock 'n Roll" which was number-one on the Billboard Hot 100 for seven weeks in 1982. Jett's other notable songs include "Bad Reputation", "Light of Day", "I Hate Myself for Loving You" and her covers of "Crimson and Clover", "Do You Wanna Touch Me (Oh Yeah)" and "Dirty Deeds".

Jett has a mezzo-soprano vocal range. She has three albums that have been certified platinum or gold. She has been described as "the Queen of Rock 'n' Roll". Joan Jett & the Blackhearts were inducted into the Rock and Roll Hall of Fame in 2015.

Jett lives in Long Beach, New York, and has been a New York resident since the late 1970s.

Early life
Joan Marie Larkin was born on September 22, 1958, to James and Dorothy Larkin, at Lankenau Hospital in Wynnewood, Pennsylvania, a suburb of Philadelphia (some sources list her birth date as September 22, 1960, which is incorrect). She is the oldest of three children. Her father was an insurance salesman and her mother was a secretary. Her family was Protestant, attended church, and went to Sunday school, but were not strict in their religious beliefs. In 1967, her family moved to Rockville, Maryland, where she attended Randolph Junior High and Wheaton High School. Jett got her first guitar at the age of 13. She took some guitar lessons, but soon quit because the instructor kept trying to teach her folk songs. Her family then moved to West Covina, California, in Los Angeles County, providing Jett the opportunity to pursue her musical interests. Shortly after the move, her parents divorced and she changed her name to Joan Jett, because she thought it had more of a rock-star sound than her birth name (she has admitted in recent years that "Jett" was not actually her mother's maiden name, even though that is what she used to tell people).

In Los Angeles, Jett's favorite night spot was Rodney Bingenheimer's English Disco, a venue that provided the glam rock style she loved.

Career

The Runaways 

At age 16, Jett became a founding member of the Runaways with drummer Sandy West. After the brief tenure of singer and bass guitarist Micki Steele, Jackie Fox, Lita Ford, and Cherie Currie soon joined to complete the band, creating the classic lineup. While Currie initially fronted the band, Jett shared some lead vocals, played rhythm guitar, and wrote or co-wrote some of the band's material along with Ford, West, and Currie. This lineup recorded three albums, with Live in Japan becoming one of the biggest-selling imports in US and UK history.

The band toured around the world and became an opening act for Cheap Trick, Ramones, Van Halen, and Tom Petty and the Heartbreakers. They found success abroad, especially in Japan. While touring England with the Runaways in 1976, Jett first heard the song "I Love Rock 'n' Roll" when she saw Arrows perform it on their weekly UK television series Arrows.

While the Runaways were popular in Europe, Asia, Australia, Canada, and South America, they could not garner the same level of success in the United States. After Currie left the band, the band released two more albums with Jett handling the lead vocals: Waitin' for the Night and And Now... The Runaways. Altogether, they produced five albums from 1975 until they disbanded in the spring of 1979.

Soon after, Jett produced the Germs' only album, (GI).

In 2010, The Runaways, a movie about Jett's band, was released, starring Kristen Stewart as Jett and Dakota Fanning as Currie.

Solo career
In 1979, Jett was in England pursuing a solo career. She recorded three songs there with the Sex Pistols' Paul Cook and Steve Jones, one of which was an early version of Arrows' "I Love Rock 'n' Roll". This version appears on the 1993 compilation album Flashback. Later that year, she returned to Los Angeles, where she began fulfilling an obligation of the Runaways to complete a film that was loosely based on the band's career entitled We're All Crazee Now! Three actresses stood in for the departed band members, including Rainbeaux Smith, who was also a rock drummer. While working on the project, Jett met songwriter and producer Kenny Laguna, who was hired by her manager Toby Mamis to help Jett with writing some tracks for the film. They became friends and decided to work together and Jett relocated to Long Beach, New York, where Laguna was based. The plug was pulled on the project halfway through shooting after Jett fell ill, but in 1984, after she became famous, producers looked for a way to use the footage from the incomplete film. Parts of the original footage of Jett were eventually used in another project, an underground film called Du-beat-eo, which was produced by Alan Sacks, but not commercially released.

Jett and Laguna entered the Who's Ramport Studios with the latter at the helm, and Jett's self-titled solo debut was released by Ariola Records in Europe on May 17, 1980. In the US, after the album was rejected by 23 major labels, Jett and Laguna released it independently on their new Blackheart Records label, which they started with Laguna's daughter's college savings. Laguna remembers, "We couldn't think of anything else to do but print up records ourselves."

Joan Jett and the Blackhearts

With Laguna's assistance, Jett formed the Blackhearts. Laguna recounted, "I told Joanie to forget the band and support herself on the advance money. There was enough for her but not for a band. She said she had to have a band. And I believe to this day that it was the Blackhearts, that concept, that made Joan Jett." She placed an ad in the LA Weekly stating that she was "looking for three good men". John Doe of X sat in on bass for the auditions held at S.I.R. studios in Los Angeles. He mentioned a local bass player, Gary Ryan, who had recently been crashing on his couch. Ryan was born Gary Moss, and adopted his stage name upon joining the Blackhearts in 1979, in part to cover for the fact that he was only 15 at the time. Ryan was part of the Los Angeles punk scene and had played bass with local artists Top Jimmy and Rik L. Rik. He had been a fan of the Runaways and Jett for years. Jett recognized him at the audition and he was in. Ryan in turn recommended guitarist Eric Ambel, who was also at the time part of Rik L. Rik. The final addition to the original Blackhearts was drummer Danny "Furious" O'Brien, formerly of the San Francisco band the Avengers. This lineup played several gigs at the Golden Bear, in Huntington Beach, California, and the Whisky a Go Go in Hollywood before embarking on their first European tour, which consisted of an extensive tour of the Netherlands and a few key shows in England, including the Marquee in London.

Laguna fired O'Brien at the end of the tour, and upon returning to the States, Jett, Ryan, and Ambel moved to Long Beach, New York. Auditions were set up, and Lee Crystal, formerly of the Boyfriends and Sylvain Sylvain, became the new drummer. The band then toured throughout the US, slowly building a fan base, but struggling to remain financially afloat. Throughout 1980, the band was able to keep touring solely due to Laguna drawing on advances from outside projects. Jett and Laguna used their personal savings to press copies of the Joan Jett album and set up their own system of distribution, sometimes selling the albums out of the trunk of Laguna's Cadillac at the end of each concert. Laguna was unable to keep up with demand for the album. Eventually, old friend and founder of Casablanca Records, Neil Bogart, made a joint venture with Laguna and signed Jett to his new label, Boardwalk Records and re-released the Joan Jett album as Bad Reputation.

A spring 1981 concert at the Palladium in New York City proved to be a turning point. Described by music journalists as a career-defining performance by Jett, it helped solidify a strong New York City following for Joan Jett and the Blackhearts. After a year of touring and recording, the Blackhearts recorded a new album entitled I Love Rock 'n Roll for the label. Ambel was replaced by local guitarist Ricky Byrd during the recording. Byrd recalled in an interview with Guitarhoo!, "One day I went to a studio to jam around a bit with Jett and everything clicked". The first single from the album was the title track, "I Love Rock 'n' Roll", which in the first half of 1982 was number one on the Billboard Hot 100 for seven weeks in a row. It is Billboard No. 56 song of all time and has also been inducted into the Grammy Hall of Fame in 2016.

Jett released Album (1983) and Glorious Results of a Misspent Youth (1984). A string of Top 40 hits followed, as well as sellout tours with the Police, Queen, and Aerosmith, among others. She was among the first English-speaking rock acts to appear in Panama and the Dominican Republic.

After receiving her own MTV New Year's Eve special, Jett beat out a number of contenders to appear in the movie Light of Day with Michael J. Fox. Bruce Springsteen wrote the song "Light of Day" especially for the movie, and her performance was critically acclaimed. It was about this time that Ryan and Crystal left the Blackhearts. They were soon replaced by Thommy Price and Kasim Sulton. Later that year, Jett released Good Music, which featured appearances by the Beach Boys, the Sugarhill Gang, and singer Darlene Love.

Joan Jett and the Blackhearts became the first rock band to perform a series of shows at the Lunt–Fontanne Theatre on Broadway, breaking the record at the time for the fastest ticket sell-out. Her next release, Up Your Alley, went multi-platinum. This album contains the single "I Hate Myself for Loving You", which peaked at No. 8 on the Billboard Hot 100 chart, and had been used as the theme song for Sunday Night Football NFL games in America (with altered lyrics, by two singers) during the 2006 and 2007 seasons. This was followed by The Hit List, which was an album consisting of cover songs. During this time, Jett co-wrote the song "House of Fire", which appeared on Alice Cooper's 1989 album Trash.

In 1990, the band had a song on [[Days of Thunder (soundtrack)|Days of Thunder'''s soundtrack]], "Long Live the Night", written by Jett with Randy Cantor and Michael Caruso.

Her 1991 release, Notorious, which featured the Replacements' Paul Westerberg and former Billy Idol bass player Phil Feit, was the last with Sony/CBS, as Jett switched to Warner Bros. A CD single of "Let's Do It" featuring Jett and Westerberg was also released during this time, and appeared in the song credits for the movie Tank Girl. In 1993, Jett and Laguna released Flashback, a compilation of various songs on their own Blackheart Records.

Jett produced several bands prior to releasing her debut, and her label Blackheart Records released recordings from varied artists such as thrash metal band Metal Church and rapper Big Daddy Kane.

The press touted Jett as the "Godmother of Punk" and the "Original Riot Grrrl". In 1994, the Blackhearts released the well-received Pure and Simple, which featured tracks written with Babes in Toyland's Kat Bjelland, L7's Donita Sparks and Bikini Kill's Kathleen Hanna. Jett has also been described as the Queen of Rock 'n' Roll.

Timeline of members

Ongoing work
Jett returned to producing for the band Circus Lupus in 1992 and again, in 1994, for Bikini Kill. This recording was the New Radio +2 vinyl 7-inch EP for which she also played and sang back-up vocals. The Riot Grrrl movement started in the early 1990s, with Bikini Kill as a representative band, and many of these women credited Jett as a role model and inspiration.

In 1997, Jett was featured on the We Will Fall: The Iggy Pop Tribute album. She performed a cover of the Johnny O'Keefe song "Wild One" (or "Real Wild Child"). Jett worked with members of the punk rock band the Gits, whose lead singer and lyricist, Mia Zapata, had been raped and murdered in 1993. The results of their collaboration was a live album, Evil Stig and a single, "Bob", whose earnings were contributed to the investigation of Zapata's murder. To this end, the band and Jett appeared on the television show America's Most Wanted, appealing to the public for information. The case was solved in 2004, when Zapata's murderer, Jesus Mezquia, was brought to trial and convicted.

Jett is a guest artist on Marky Ramone and the Intruders' 1999 album The Answer to Your Problems? on the track "Don't Blame Me". She is a guest vocalist on Peaches' album Impeach My Bush on the tracks "Boys Wanna Be Her" and "You Love It".

At an October 2001 9/11 benefit in Red Bank, New Jersey, Jett and Springsteen appeared together on stage for the first time and played "Light of Day".

In 2004, Jett and Laguna produced the album No Apologies by the pop punk band the Eyeliners, after signing them. Jett also guested on the track "Destroy" and made a cameo appearance in its music video.

In 2005, Jett and Laguna signed punk rockers the Vacancies and produced their second album, A Beat Missing or a Silence Added (reaching the top 20 in CMJ Music Charts), and their third album in 2007, Tantrum. That same year, she was recruited by Steven Van Zandt to host her own radio show on Van Zandt's Underground Garage radio channel on Sirius Satellite Radio. She hosted a four-hour show titled Joan Jett's Radio Revolution, broadcast every Saturday and Sunday. The program moved from Sirius 25 (Underground Garage) to Sirius 28 shortly before being canceled in June 2008.

In 2005, Jett and Laguna celebrated the 25th anniversary of Blackheart Records with a sellout show at Manhattan's Webster Hall.

In June 2006, Jett released her album Sinner, on Blackheart Records. To support the album, the band appeared on the 2006 Warped Tour and on a fall 2006 tour with Eagles of Death Metal. Various other bands such as Antigone Rising, Valient Thorr, the Vacancies, Throw Rag and Riverboat Gamblers were to have joined the tour for a handful of dates each. Jett sang a duet with Chase Noles on "Tearstained Letters", a song on the Heart Attacks' 2006 album, Hellbound and Heartless.

Joan Jett & the Blackhearts headlined the Albuquerque, New Mexico Freedom Fourth celebration on July 4, 2007, with an estimated crowd of 65,000 in attendance at the annual outdoor event. In November 2007, Joan Jett & the Blackhearts appeared with Motörhead and Alice Cooper in a UK arena tour; Jett opened eight American shows on Aerosmith's 2007 World Tour.

Following the Dave Clark Five's induction to the Rock and Roll Hall of Fame, on March 10, 2008, Jett, as part of the ceremony, closed the program with a performance of the Dave Clark Five's 1964 hit "Bits and Pieces". Joan Jett & the Blackhearts appeared on several dates of the True Colors tour in the summer of 2008. She opened for Def Leppard in August. On November 19, 2009, Mattel released a Joan Jett Barbie doll. Her name and likeness was used with her permission.

Joan Jett & the Blackhearts were part of the lineup for the Falls Music & Arts Festival, December 29 through January 1, 2010, in Australia.

Jett was an executive producer for the film The Runaways, which chronicled the Runaways' career. It was written and directed by Floria Sigismondi, who has directed videos for Marilyn Manson, the White Stripes and David Bowie. Production of the movie began filming around Twilight's Kristen Stewart's filming schedule, (i.e. of the sequels New Moon and Eclipse). Stewart played Jett in the film. In order to prepare for the role, Stewart met Jett around January 2009. In an interview, Stewart revealed that she hoped to be able to sing some songs in the film. The film explores the relationship between Jett and Runaways' lead singer, Cherie Currie, played by Dakota Fanning, and premiered at the 2010 Sundance Film Festival on January 24, 2010. Joan Jett and the Blackhearts appeared at the 2010 Sundance Film Festival, at Harry-O's, to promote the film.

In March 2010, she released a 2-LP/CD Greatest Hits album with four newly re-recorded songs, as well as a hardcover biography, spanning her career from the Runaways to the present day. In June 2010, Joan Jett & the Blackhearts opened for Green Day on their UK tour alongside acts such as Frank Turner and Paramore. The band was the opening act for Aerosmith's September 2010 Canadian tour.

Jett, along with the Blackhearts, released the album Unvarnished on September 30, 2013. The album reached Billboard's Top 50. It included songs dealing with the death of her parents and other people. August 1 was declared Joan Jett day in West Hollywood. She was named West Hollywood's Rock Legend.

Former Blackhearts drummer Lee Crystal (born Lee Jamie Sackett in 1956 in Brooklyn, New York) died from complications of multiple sclerosis on November 5, 2013, at the age of 57.

Jett starred in and was the executive producer of the film Undateable John, which was released in 2014. In April 2014, Jett fronted the remaining members of Nirvana for a performance of "Smells Like Teen Spirit" for their induction into the Rock and Roll Hall of Fame. She joined the band again later that night for its surprise concert at Saint Vitus. In April 2014, Jett was the first woman to win the Golden God Award. Former bandmates Cherie Currie and Lita Ford supported her. On April 24, 2014, Alternative Press magazine held its first-ever Alternative Press Music Awards, and Jett received the AP Icon Award. On July 12, 2014, Joan Jett and the Blackhearts performed at Tropicana Field after the baseball game in St. Petersburg, Florida. On October 29, 2014, Jett sang the U.S. national anthem at the New York Knicks vs. the Chicago Bulls basketball game. Jett and Hot Topic released Jett's first clothing line in 2014. It consists of jackets, shirts, pants, and a sweater.

On April 15, 2015, Jett & the Blackhearts opened for the Who, kicking off their "The Who Hits 50!" 2015 North American tour in Tampa, Florida. The Blackhearts opened for the Who for 42 dates in the U.S. and Canada, ending November 4 in Philadelphia. On July 4, 2015, Joan Jett & the Blackhearts were part of the Foo Fighters' 20th anniversary show at the RFK Stadium in Washington, D.C.

Joan Jett and the Blackhearts were inducted in the Rock and Roll Hall of Fame in 2015.

In September 2018, Jett signed a music distribution deal with Sony Music's Legacy Recordings, making her catalogue officially available for streaming.

Jett, along with the Blackhearts, was scheduled to join Mötley Crüe and Def Leppard on the 2020 The Stadium Tour as an opening act along with Poison however tour was postponed to the summer of 2021 due to the COVID-19 pandemic. In May 2021 it was announced that tour was again postponed and will now happen in the summer of 2022. Jett announced that she will embark on a North American tour in the fall of 2021. The tour ended on September 28, 2021, at the Paramount in Huntington, NY.

On May 14, 2021, it was announced that to celebrate the 40th anniversaries of Jett's first two albums, Bad Reputation and I Love Rock & Roll, Z2 Comics was releasing two graphic novels titled Joan Jett and the Blackhearts - 40x40: Bad Reputation/I Love Rock 'n' Roll that will bring Jett's "songs to life as 20 vivid stories" by female writers and artists in the comic book industry. The books were released in November 2021.

Joan Jett and the Blackhearts released Changeup on March 25, 2022, the first acoustic album ever recorded by the band, featuring "Bad Reputation" and "Crimson and Clover".

Other work
Jett has long supported animal rights activism and organizations such as People for the Ethical Treatment of Animals (PETA). For Valentine's Day 2022, PETA created a (Black)Heart-Shaped Pizza as a limited-time collaboration with a Los Angeles pizza shop, PIZZANISTA!

Jett is a sports fan and has remained actively involved in the sports world. "Bad Reputation" was used by Ultimate Fighting Championship's Women's Bantamweight Champion Ronda Rousey as her walkout song at the pay-per-view event UFC 157 and is her current theme music in WWE. In April 2019, Jett performed "Bad Reputation" at WWE's WrestleMania 35 as Rousey was making her entrance. Her cover of "Love Is All Around" (the theme song of The Mary Tyler Moore Show) was used by the NCAA to promote the Women's Final Four, as well as the song "Unfinished Business", which was never commercially released. "Love Is All Around" gained substantial radio play and became the number one requested song without a supporting album. Jett supplied theme songs for the ESPN X Games premiere and has contributed music to all their games since. At Cal Ripken Jr.'s request she sang the U.S. national anthem at the Baltimore Orioles game in which he tied Lou Gehrig's record for consecutive games played. She also sang the national anthem at the final game played at Memorial Stadium. From 2006 to 2015, the melody for her song "I Hate Myself for Loving You" was used as the theme music for NBC Sunday Night Football with re-worked lyrics and retitled "Waiting All Day for Sunday Night". Beginning with the 2019 season, Jett performs the song with Carrie Underwood in the opener of Sunday Night Football games.

Though Jett supported Howard Dean in the 2004 election because of his opposition to the Iraq War,
she has been a consistent supporter of the United States Armed Forces throughout her career and has toured for the United Service Organizations for over 20 years, and even performed at the United States Military Academy. She often explains that while she doesn't like war, she loves the military.

Satire and tributes
In 1983, musical satirist "Weird Al" Yankovic released a parody of "I Love Rock 'n' Roll" entitled "I Love Rocky Road", changing the singer's passion for rock music with that for ice cream.

Her name appears in the lyrics of the Le Tigre song "Hot Topic", released in 1999.

In 2019 British blogger "Ladbaby" released a parody of I love Rock 'n' Roll, changing the singer's passion for rock music with that for sausage rolls.  "I love Sausage Rolls" became the Christmas No.1 in the UK.

The comic strip Bloom County included a character named Tess Turbo; her band was the Blackheads.

Film, stage and television appearances
Jett's first appearance on film is in the 1981 live concert film Urgh! A Music War, performing "Bad Reputation" with the Blackhearts at the Ritz in New York City.

She made her acting debut in 1987, co-starring with Gena Rowlands and Michael J. Fox in the Paul Schrader film Light of Day. She has appeared in independent films, including The Sweet Life and Boogie Boy.

In 1992, she was a guest star in "Free Fall", a first-season episode of TV's Highlander: The Series.

In 1997, she appeared on the sitcom Ellen, in the episode "Hello Muddah, Hello Faddah", performing the title song.

The 1999 series Freaks and Geeks used the song "Bad Reputation" as the opening theme.

In 2000, Jett appeared in the Broadway production of The Rocky Horror Show in the role of Columbia. That same year, Jett appeared on Walker, Texas Ranger as an ex-CIA agent turned assassin hired to kill Walker and Alex.

In 2002, Jett appeared in the film By Hook or by Crook in the role of News Interviewee.

From 2000 to 2003, Jett hosted a showcase of new film and video shorts, Independent Eye, for Maryland Public Television.

In 2004, Jett narrated a short film, Godly Boyish, about two teenagers who share suicidal fantasies.

In 2008, Jett made a cameo appearance in Darren Lynn Bousman's rock opera/file Repo! The Genetic Opera as the guitarist in Shilo's room during the piece "Seventeen". Also in 2008, she appeared in the Law & Order: Criminal Intent episode "Reunion" as a rock-and-roll talk show host who is murdered.

Jett played Betsy Neal in the film Big Driver. The film, based on Stephen King's novella of the same name, premiered on Lifetime on October 18, 2014.

Jett provided the voice for the character Sunshine Justice in an episode of Steven Universe.

Jett was the subject of a documentary, Bad Reputation, which was released in theaters and streaming on September 28, 2018.

 Equipment 
Jett's signature guitar is a white Gibson Melody Maker, which she has played on all her hits since 1977. Jett bought her first Melody Maker from Eric Carmen, following the breakup of the Raspberries. In regard to her white Melody Maker, the singer once stated:

In The Runaways I was using a blond Les Paul. It's beautiful, and I still have it, but it's heavy as shit. I jump and run around a lot onstage, and it was really getting to my shoulder, so I was looking for a lighter guitar. I heard from one of our road crew that Eric Carmen from the Raspberries was selling a Melody Maker, so I ended up buying it. Now, this is the guitar that he played on "Go All the Way" and all those [Raspberries] hits. And then I played it on "I Love Rock 'n' Roll", "Crimson and Clover", "Do You Want to Touch Me", "Bad Reputation" ...all those early records. Then I took it off the road because I got nervous that someone was gonna steal it or break it. It's so beautiful. It's white, has no stickers on it, and there are cracks in the paint and yellowing from age or club cigarettes. It's an unbelievable-looking guitar. I have it in a closet and I take it out occasionally to record. But I don't even need to use it to record anymore, because I have a guitar that sounds pretty much like it. I'm actually kind of afraid to bring out the original. It's got a great heritage. It's a guitar full of hits.

In 2008 Gibson released the "Joan Jett Signature Melody Maker". It differs from Jett's model by having a single burstbucker 3 humbucker pickup, an ebony fretboard and a double-cutaway body in white with a black vinyl pickguard. It also features a kill switch in place of a pickup selector. It retails for $839. There is now also a "Blackheart" version of this guitar introduced in 2010. All specs are the same, but it is finished in black, with red and pearl heart inlays. 
In June 2019, Gibson announced and released a third signature guitar for Jett, which is a wine-colored ES-339. The guitar was released after two years of research and development with Jett.

Personal life

Jett has been a vegetarian since the late 1980s and supports animal rights."What's in your basket, Joan Jett?". theguardian.com. Retrieved January 22, 2023.

Jett had, for years, refused to either confirm or deny rumors that she is lesbian or bisexual. In a 1994 interview with Out magazine she said, "I'm not saying no, I'm not saying yes, I'm saying believe what you want. Assume away—go ahead." In 2006, she responded to an interviewer who had asked her when she had "come out" as a lesbian by saying, "I never made any kind of statement about my personal life on any level. I never made any proclamations. So I don't know where people are getting that from."

In 2016, former Runaways guitarist Lita Ford revealed in her memoir that she temporarily quit the band because the other members were "all gay" saying "First I found out that Sandy, the one I had bonded with the most, was a lesbian. Then I found out that Cherie was messing around with Joan. I was so freaked out that I quit the band. When I found out that the girls were all gay in the band, I wasn't sure how to take it. I didn't know what it was."

In a 2018 interview with the New York Times, when asked about how an LGBT film festival did not want to show her documentary because she was not "out", Jett said: "They don't want the movie there because I don't declare? [Holding up her necklace] What the [expletive] is that? Two labryses, or axes, crossing each other, inside of two women's symbols crossing each other. It's not been off since I got it. And I wear this one every day. [She turns around, lifts her shirt and reveals a tattoo with similar female symbols on her lower back.] I don't know how much more you can declare."

 Controversy 

 Kim Fowley rape allegation 
In July 2015, attorney Jackie Fuchs (formerly Jackie Fox of The Runaways) alleged that Kim Fowley raped her on New Year's Eve 1975, at a party following a Runaways performance at an Orange County club. Sixteen years old at the time, Fuchs was reportedly given Quaaludes by a man she thought was a roadie, and while she was incapacitated, Fowley allegedly raped her in full view of a group of partygoers and her bandmates Currie, West, and Jett; Ford was not present. Look Away, a documentary about sexual abuse in the rock music industry features Fuchs' story.

Fuchs said that her last memory of the night was seeing Currie and Jett staring at her as Fowley raped her. Kari Krome (co-founder and songwriter for the group) stated that she saw, "Jett and Currie sitting off to the side of the room for part of the time, snickering" during the rape. In 2015, Jett stated "Anyone who truly knows me understands that if I was aware of a friend or bandmate being violated, I would not stand by while it happened. For a group of young teenagers thrust into '70s rock stardom there were relationships that were bizarre, but I was not aware of this incident. Obviously Jackie's story is extremely upsetting and although we haven't spoken in decades, I wish her peace and healing." Victory Tischler-Blue (Fuchs's replacement in the group) said that all the members of the group "have always been aware of this ugly event".

Awards and honors
 Long Island Music Hall of Fame (Class of 2006).
 Rolling Stone 100 greatest guitarists of all time (No. 87).
 Gibson manufactured a signature model of her Melody Maker, a white double cutaway with a zebra humbucker and "kill" toggle switch. 
 2012 Nanci Alexander Activist Award for her work on behalf of animal welfare.
 2013 named and awarded West Hollywood's Rock Legend.
 2014 AP Icon Award
 2014 Golden God Award
 Rock and Roll Hall of Fame inductee (Class of 2015)

Discography

Solo
 Joan Jett (1980); re-released as Bad Reputation (1981)
 The Hit List (1990)
with the Blackhearts
 I Love Rock 'n Roll (1981)
 Album (1983)
 Glorious Results of a Misspent Youth (1984)
 Good Music (1986)
 Up Your Alley (1988)
 Notorious (1991)
 Pure and Simple (1994)
 Naked (2004)
 Sinner (2006)
 Unvarnished (2013)
 Changeup'' (2022)

Filmography

References

External links

 
 
 
 
 
 

 
1958 births
20th-century American guitarists
20th-century American singers
20th-century American women singers
21st-century American singers
21st-century American women singers
American film actresses
American women rock singers
American women singer-songwriters
American feminists
American Protestants
American punk rock guitarists
American punk rock singers
American mezzo-sopranos
American rock guitarists
American rock songwriters
American women record producers
Blackheart Records artists
Women punk rock singers
Feminist musicians
Guitarists from Philadelphia
Living people
People from Long Beach, New York
People from Montgomery County, Pennsylvania
People from Rockville Centre, New York
Protopunk musicians
Record producers from Pennsylvania
Rhythm guitarists
Singer-songwriters from Pennsylvania
The Runaways members
20th-century American women guitarists
Singer-songwriters from New York (state)
Proto-riot grrrl bands
Women in punk